The 2022–23 Tasmania JackJumpers season was the 2nd season for the franchise in the National Basketball League (NBL).

Roster

Standings

Ladder 

The NBL tie-breaker system as outlined in the NBL Rules and Regulations states that in the case of an identical win–loss record, the overall points percentage will determine order of seeding.

Ladder progression

Game log

Pre-season 

|-style="background:#BBF3BB;"
| 1
| 6 September 
| S.E. Melbourne
| W 88–83
| Rashard Kelly (20)
| Matt Kenyon (6)
| Josh Magette (6)
| Ulverstone Sports & Leisure Centre1,100
| 1–0
|-style="background:#BBF3BB;"
| 2
| 8 September
| S.E. Melbourne
| W 84–80
| Milton Doyle (17)
| Kelly, Kenyon (5)
| Josh Magette (6)
| Elphin Sports Centre1,100
| 2–0

NBL Blitz 

|-style="background:#BBF3BB;"
| 1
| 17 September
| Sydney
| W 73–53
| Jack McVeigh (16)
| Matt Kenyon (5)
| Josh Magette (5)
| Darwin Basketball Facility916
| 1–0
|-style="background:#FFBBBB;"
| 2
| 19 September
| @ Adelaide
| L 87–79
| Jack McVeigh (16)
| Kelly, Kenyon, Macdonald (5)
| Josh Magette (7)
| Darwin Basketball Facility838
| 1–1
|-style="background:#BBF3BB;"
| 3
| 22 September
| Cairns
| W 100–81
| Jack McVeigh (25)
| Isaac White (8)
| Doyle, Magette (4)
| Darwin Basketball Facility912
| 2–1

Regular season 

|-style="background:#FFBBBB;"
| 1
| 1 October
| @ S.E. Melbourne
| L 84–79
| Jack McVeigh (20)
| Rashard Kelly (6)
| Josh Magette (8)
| John Cain Arena5,728
| 0–1
|-style="background:#FFBBBB;"
| 2
| 3 October
| Cairns
| L 84–106
| Rashard Kelly (15)
| Fabijan Krslovic (5)
| Josh Magette (5)
| MyState Bank Arena4,231
| 0–2
|-style="background:#FFBBBB;"
| 3
| 7 October
| @ New Zealand
| L 71–65
| Jack McVeigh (19)
| Rashard Kelly (10)
| Doyle, Magette (5)
| Spark Arena5,340
| 0–3
|-style="background:#BBF3BB;"
| 4
| 9 October
| Brisbane
| W 90–86 (OT)
| Milton Doyle (32)
| Kelly, McVeigh (9)
| Milton Doyle (4)
| MyState Bank Arena4,231
| 1–3
|-style="background:#BBF3BB;"
| 5
| 13 October
| @ Adelaide
| W 72–97
| Josh Magette (23)
| Bairstow, Kelly (6)
| Josh Magette (7)
| Adelaide Entertainment Centre8,027
| 2–3
|-style="background:#BBF3BB;"
| 6
| 16 October
| @ Melbourne
| W 64–74
| Kelly, Krslovic (13)
| Rashard Kelly (12)
| Doyle, Magette, White (3)
| John Cain Arena7,292
| 3–3
|-style="background:#BBF3BB;"
| 7
| 22 October
| Perth
| W 103–72
| Jack McVeigh (17)
| Milton Doyle (10)
| Josh Magette (10)
| MyState Bank Arena4,231
| 4–3
|-style="background:#FFBBBB;"
| 8
| 30 October
| @ New Zealand
| L 94–62
| Milton Doyle (22)
| Rashard Kelly (7)
| Jarrad Weeks (3)
| Spark Arena3,811
| 4–4

|-style="background:#BBF3BB;"
| 9
| 3 November 
| @ Perth
| W 77–85
| Jack McVeigh (22)
| Milton Doyle (10)
| Milton Doyle (5)
| RAC Arena9,805
| 5–4
|-style="background:#FFBBBB;"
| 10
| 5 November
| Brisbane
| L 72–74
| Jack McVeigh (17)
| Rashard Kelly (11)
| Josh Magette (3)
| MyState Bank Arena4,231
| 5–5
|-style="background:#FFBBBB;"
| 11
| 18 November
| New Zealand
| L 76–84
| Rashard Kelly (17)
| Rashard Kelly (8)
| Sean Macdonald (2)
| Silverdome3,122
| 5–6
|-style="background:#BBF3BB;"
| 12
| 26 November
| @ Melbourne
| W 90–94
| Milton Doyle (23)
| Jack McVeigh (7)
| Kelly, McVeigh (3)
| John Cain Arena6,263
| 6–6

|-style="background:#BBF3BB;"
| 13
| 4 December
| @ Brisbane
| W 84–99
| Milton Doyle (33)
| Milton Doyle (9)
| Sean Macdonald (4)
| Nissan Arena3,811
| 7–6
|-style="background:#BBF3BB;"
| 14
| 11 December
| @ Sydney
| W 76–84
| Milton Doyle (25)
| Jack McVeigh (9)
| Josh Magette (6)
| Qudos Bank Arena7,321
| 8–6
|-style="background:#FFBBBB;"
| 15
| 17 December
| Cairns
| L 82–91
| Jack McVeigh (17)
| Milton Doyle (7)
| Josh Magette (4)
| MyState Bank Arena4,231
| 8–7
|-style="background:#FFBBBB;"
| 16
| 19 December
| @ Adelaide
| L 93–82
| Milton Doyle (18)
| Milton Doyle (6)
| Josh Magette (6)
| Adelaide Entertainment Centre7,010
| 8–8
|-style="background:#BBF3BB;"
| 17
| 22 December 
| Illawarra
| W 87–60
| Jack McVeigh (15)
| Milton Doyle (8)
| Doyle, Macdonald, Magette (4)
| MyState Bank Arena4,269
| 9–8
|-style="background:#BBF3BB;"
| 18
| 26 December
| New Zealand
| W 93–82
| Josh Magette (16)
| Will Magnay (9)
| Doyle, Magette (4)
| MyState Bank Arena4,269
| 10–8
|-style="background:#FFBBBB;"
| 19
| 30 December
| @ Sydney
| L 97–77
| Clint Steindl (13)
| Fabijan Krslovic (3)
| Josh Magette (3)
| Qudos Bank Arena12,467
| 10–9

|-style="background:#BBF3BB;"
| 20
| 1 January
| S.E. Melbourne
| W 99–74
| Milton Doyle (25)
| Rashard Kelly (8)
| Milton Doyle (7)
| MyState Bank Arena4,269
| 11–9
|-style="background:#FFBBBB;"
| 21
| 7 January
| Melbourne
| L 85–92
| Milton Doyle (20)
| Rashard Kelly (6)
| Josh Magette (5)
| MyState Bank Arena4,269
| 11–10
|-style="background:#BBF3BB;"
| 22
| 10 January
| @ Illawarra
| W 89–92
| Rashard Kelly (18)
| Josh Magette (8)
| Doyle, Magette (6)
| WIN Entertainment Centre2,846
| 12–10
|-style="background:#BBF3BB;"
| 23
| 12 January
| Adelaide
| W 98–82
| Doyle, McVeigh (28)
| Doyle, McVeigh (6)
| Josh Magette (5)
| MyState Bank Arena4,293
| 13–10
|-style="background:#FFBBBB;"
| 24
| 18 January
| S.E. Melbourne
| L 75–86
| Milton Doyle (16)
| Will Magnay (7)
| Milton Doyle (6)
| Silverdome3,286
| 13–11
|-style="background:#BBF3BB;"
| 25
| 20 January
| @ Cairns
| W 77–85
| Jack McVeigh (18)
| Doyle, Magette (6)
| Milton Doyle (8)
| Cairns Convention Centre4,705
| 14–11
|-style="background:#FFBBBB;"
| 26
| 27 January
| Sydney
| L 77–91
| Isaac White (11)
| Rashard Kelly (6)
| Milton Doyle (3)
| MyState Bank Arena4,293
| 14–12
|-style="background:#BBF3BB;"
| 27
| 29 January
| Perth
| W 102–94
| Milton Doyle (21)
| Kelly, McVeigh (5)
| Josh Magette (11)
| MyState Bank Arena4,293
| 15–12

|-style="background:#BBF3BB;"
| 28
| 4 February
| @ Illawarra
| W 63–87
| Milton Doyle (20)
| Fabijan Krslovic (9)
| Milton Doyle (10)
| WIN Entertainment Centre3,511
| 16–12

Postseason 

|-style="background:#BBF3BB;"
| 1
| 9 February 
| @ Cairns
| W 79–87
| Milton Doyle (25)
| Rashard Kelly (12)
| Doyle, Kelly (4)
| Cairns Convention Centre3,670
| 1–0

|-style="background:#FFBBBB;"
| 2
| 12 February 
| @ New Zealand
| L 88–68
| Rashard Kelly (12)
| Matt Kenyon (6)
| Milton Doyle (4)
| Spark Arena5,479
| 1–1
|-style="background:#BBF3BB;"
| 3
| 16 February 
| New Zealand
| W 89–78
| Milton Doyle (23)
| Kenyon, Magnay (6)
| Milton Doyle (5)
| MyState Bank Arena4,293
| 2–1
|-style="background:#FFBBBB;"
| 4
| 19 February 
| @ New Zealand
| L 92–77
| Jack McVeigh (22)
| Jack McVeigh (7)
| Doyle, Krslovic (3)
| Spark Arena6,410
| 2–2

Transactions

Re-signed

Additions

Subtractions

Awards

Club awards 
 Coaches Award: Sean MacDonald
 Spirit of the JackJumpers: Ryan Carroll (Sports Physiotherapist)
 Players Award: Isaac White
 Defensive Player: Will Magnay
 Fan Favourite: Jack McVeigh
 Club MVP: Milton Doyle

See also 
 2022–23 NBL season
 Tasmania JackJumpers

References

External links 

 Official Website

Tasmania JackJumpers
Tasmania JackJumpers seasons
Tasmania JackJumpers season